Hiesmayr is a German-language surname. Notable people with this surname include:
Beatrix Hiesmayr (born 1975), Austrian physicist
Ernst Hiesmayr (1920–2006), Austrian architect
 (1940–2016), Austrian academic painter

German-language surnames